Konstantinos "Kosta" Barbarouses (born 19 February 1990) is a New Zealand professional footballer who plays in Australia's A-League Men for Wellington Phoenix FC.

Club career 
Kosta was born in New Zealand and is of Greek descent. Before turning professional Barbarouses played for St. Patrick's College and for local clubs Wellington Olympic and Miramar Rangers in New Zealand's Central Premier League.

Wellington Phoenix

Barbarouses played 21 matches during his first stint with Wellington Phoenix in three seasons and scored two goals. The Phoenix club officially signed Barbarouses as one of its foundation players on 4 May 2007. Seventeen years old and still at school, he started as the club's youngest player. He made his professional debut on 21 October 2007 against Central Coast Mariners, coming on as a substitute in the 86th minute. He played his first full professional game when he fronted against Central Coast Mariners on 19 January 2008.

Barbarouses scored his first professional goal on 18 January 2009 – an equaliser against Adelaide United. He scored his second A-League goal against Sydney FC on 1 November 2009 after coming off the bench to replace Leo Bertos. He scored the goal off a volley which bounced over Clint Bolton. Barbarouses played his first match starting in the first team line-up against Newcastle Jets on 4 November 2009, assisting Chris Greenacre's goal with a back-heel pass.

Brisbane Roar
Barbarouses turned down a two-year contract extension with Wellington Phoenix in February 2010 for a three-year contract with A-League side Brisbane Roar. Brisbane Roar play an attractive brand of football and Barbarouses wanted the opportunity to play more regular football. In the 2009–10 season, which took the Phoenix into the finals, Barbarouses had had only three starts, and ten appearances off the bench.

Barbarouses made his debut for the Roar in Round 1 of the 2010–11 season, starting against Gold Coast United in a 0–0 draw on 8 August 2010. Barbarouses continued to start for the Brisbane team and played against his old club Wellington Phoenix, on 27 August 2010 at Suncorp Stadium. In the 73rd minute, he received a through-ball from team-mate Matt McKay and slotted home his first A-League goal for the Brisbane Roar. Barbarouses was named in the 2010–11 A-League All-Star Team after 12 goals in 33 appearances.

Alania Vladikavkaz
On 18 July 2011, Fairfax News NZ announced that Barbarouses had signed a three-year contract with Russian side Alania Vladikavkaz.
Brisbane Roar received $600,000 as a transfer fee. Barbarouses made his debut for Vladikavkaz on 9 August 2011, in a First Division league match against Torpedo Vladimir. He played the full 90 minutes and scored the sole goal of the match, allowing Alania to win 1–0.

Loan to Panathinaikos
On 27 June 2012, Barbarouses signed a one-year loan contract with Greek giants Panathinaikos. Barbarouses only played 11 games and scored no goals during his one-year loan spell in his ancestral country. His stand out moment was when he played against Greatest Rivals Olympiacos in a league match in Piraeus in a 1–1 draw.

Melbourne Victory
On 7 August 2013, Kosta signed a 3-year deal at Melbourne Victory under Ange Postecoglou for the second time. The first time was at rival team Brisbane Roar, following a successful career start at home town team Wellington Phoenix.
Kosta debuted for Melbourne Victory in round 2 of the 2013–14 season in the 2–2 away draw with Adelaide United.

Return to Wellington Phoenix
On 8 March 2016 it was announced that Barbarouses would leave Melbourne Victory at the end of the season to rejoin his hometown club Wellington Phoenix on a 3-year contract. On 5 June 2017 Phoenix announced they would be releasing Barbarouses following his request to leave for non-footballing reasons.

Return to Melbourne Victory
Following his release from Wellington Phoenix, Barbarouses rejoined former club Melbourne Victory on a two-year deal in June 2017. In June 2019 Melbourne Victory announced that his contract ended and he declined an extension.

Sydney FC
On 7 June 2019, Barbarouses signed on a multi-year contract deal with Sydney FC.

International career

New Zealand U-17

Barbarouses captained New Zealand at the 2007 U-17 World Cup in Korea. He scored five goals, including a hat-trick, during the team's qualifying campaign to ensure progression to the finals.

New Zealand U-20

As a member of the national Under-20 side he played an integral part in the 2008 OFC U-20 Championship qualification tournament for the 2009 Under-20 World Cup, scoring two goals in the three pool matches. New Zealand did not qualify for the final tournament.

Beijing 2008

Barbarouses played for New Zealand at the 2008 OFC Men's Olympic Football Tournament. Although he scored four goals in the five pool matches at this 2008 Beijing Olympics qualifying tournament, Barbarouses was not selected for the final squad to travel to the Games.

2010 World Cup

Barbarouses made his senior debut in a 2010 FIFA World Cup qualifier against Fiji on 19 November 2008.
He trained with the national team before its World Cup qualifying play-off against Bahrain. Barbarouses attended a 12-day All Whites training camp in Auckland in April–May 2010 as a member of a 15-man squad of Australasian-based players. He was one of two forwards on the squad.

Barbarouses had stated that he would like to make the New Zealand 2010 FIFA World Cup squad. Although widely tipped to make the final 23-man squad travel to the 2010 FIFA World Cup, Barbarouses' name was missing when NZFA chairman Frank van Hattum read out the names at Auckland's Sky City on 10 May 2010. He was, however, named as one of seven non-travelling reserves.

2011–current

A standout first season with then newly crowned A-League champions Brisbane Roar saw the 21-year-old striker included in the New Zealand squad for a friendly against China in Wuhan on 25 March 2011.

Barbarouses made the 23-man All Whites squad, where played against Mexico at altitude in Denver on 2 June and against Australia in Adelaide on 5 June.

Barbarouses formed part of an 18-man All Whites squad that played Jamaica in an international friendly at Mt Smart Stadium in Auckland, New Zealand on 29 February 2012.

On 23 May 2012, Barbarouses scored his first goal for the All Whites in a friendly match against El Salvador. His 64th-minute half-volley from close range levelled the scores and the match resulted in a 2–2 draw.

He played for New Zealand at the 2012 Summer Olympics.

Barbarouses was also selected as a member of the All Whites squad for the June 2017 friendly vs Japan.

Barbarouses was a member of New Zealands Qualification campaign for the 2018 World Cup in Russia. He played in both the home and away matches vs Peru in November 2017 as New Zealand ultimately were unsuccessful in their qualification bid.

Career statistics

Club

International
As of match played 15 November 2017. New Zealand score listed first, score column indicates score after each Barbarouses goal.

Honours

Club
Brisbane Roar
 A-League Premiership: 2010–11
 A-League Championship: 2010–11

Melbourne Victory
 A-League Premiership: 2014–15
 A-League Championship: 2014–15, 2017–18
 FFA Cup: 2015

Sydney FC
 A-League Premiership: 2019–20
 A-League Championship: 2019–20

International
New Zealand U17
 OFC U-17 Championship: 2007

New Zealand
 OFC Nations Cup: 2008, 2016

Individual
 PFA A-League Team of the Season: 2010–11, 2015–16
 Mark Viduka Medal: 2015
 Wellington Phoenix Player of the Year: 2016–17

References

External links 
 
 
 
 
 

1990 births
Living people
Association footballers from Wellington City
Association football forwards
New Zealand association footballers
New Zealand international footballers
A-League Men players
Macarthur Rams FC players
Wellington Phoenix FC players
New Zealand expatriate association footballers
New Zealand people of Greek descent
Team Wellington players
Brisbane Roar FC players
Expatriate footballers in Russia
FC Spartak Vladikavkaz players
Olympic association footballers of New Zealand
Footballers at the 2012 Summer Olympics
Melbourne Victory FC players
Sydney FC players
People educated at St. Patrick's College, Wellington
New Zealand under-20 international footballers
Wellington Olympic AFC players
Marquee players (A-League Men)
2008 OFC Nations Cup players
2012 OFC Nations Cup players
2016 OFC Nations Cup players
2017 FIFA Confederations Cup players
Panathinaikos F.C. players
New Zealand under-23 international footballers
New Zealand youth international footballers